The Trans Mountain Pipeline System, or simply the Trans Mountain Pipeline (TMPL), is a multiple product pipeline system that carries crude and refined products from Edmonton, Alberta to the coast of British Columbia, Canada.

In 2018, the Government of Canada purchased the pipeline for $4.5 billion from Kinder Morgan through the creation of the Trans Mountain Corporation (TMC), in order to "keep the project alive". TMC is a Crown corporation, a subsidiary of the Canada Development Investment Corporation (CDEV). Until the August 31, 2018 purchase by CDEV, the Trans Mountain Pipeline was owned by the Houston, Texas-based pipeline operator's Canadian division. The pipeline has been in use since 1953. It is the only pipeline to run between these two areas.

The construction of a second pipeline between Hinton, Alberta, and Hargreaves, British Columbia, running adjacent to the existing line, was completed in 2008.

In 2013, a project to twin the existing Trans Mountain pipelinethe Trans Mountain Expansion Projectwas proposed to the Canadian National Energy Board. The project was 75% complete, as of January 2023.

Since it was first proposed in 2013, this Trans Mountain Expansion Project has attracted controversy due to its potential environmental impact, having faced legal challenges, as well as protests from environmentalists and First Nations groups.  A July 2, 2020 Supreme Court decision that rejected the appeals made by First Nations and environmental groups, "[brought] an end to the years-long legal challenge".

History
In February 1947, large oil deposits were discovered near Leduc, Alberta. The idea for a pipeline from Alberta to British Columbia quickly emerged, driven by the growing demand for oil both in Asia and on the west coast of Canada and the United States. The US military was also interested in developing this infrastructure so that oil could be accessed more easily for military use.

On March 21, 1951, the Trans Mountain Pipeline Company Trans Mountain was created when the Canadian Parliament granted the company a charter under a special Act of Parliament. The proposal for the pipeline was immediately submitted to the Board of Transport Commissioners and was approved. Construction began in February 1952 and the final section was welded in place near Aldergrove, British Columbia on October 17, 1952.

According to a 2019 JWN Energy seriesInside Canada's Pipeline Industryby former editor of Oilweek, Gordon Jaremko, both the Board approval and the construction of the  pipeline were sped up as concerns about the Korean War mounted. The governments considered the TMPL to be a strategic way of reducing reliance on oil tankers, made vulnerable under threats of potential attack on the west coast of North America.

Canadian Bechtel Ltd. was responsible for engineering, design, and construction of the project. Ownership of the company was split between Canadian Bechtel Ltd. and Standard Oil.

In August 1953, crude oil from Edmonton, Alberta began flowing to refineries in the Vancouver area and the northwestern U.S. through TNPL.

The total cost of TMPL was CDN$93 million, according to then Premier of British Columbia W. A. C. Bennett at the opening ceremony.

Prior to 1983, the only product TMPL carried was crude oil to supply refineries in the Vancouver area and to the state of Washington.

Shift from single- to multiple products pipelines (1983-)
In 1983, Trans Mountain began experiments to shift from single- to multiple-product pipelines to increase efficiency and to become more competitive. By 1985, TMPL regularly carried refined-products  from Edmonton, Alberta to Kamloops, British Columbia. This had extended to Vancouver by 1993.

A 1993 report said that the TMPL was the "only major system in the world" at that time, transporting both crude oil and refined refined petroleum products" in a single pipeline.

By 1998, TMPL made regular shipments to Vancouver of refined petroleum products "including jet fuel, gasoline (unleaded and premium unleaded), diesel (regular sulfur, low sulfur, and low temperature), methyl tertiary butyl ether (MTBE), and crude-oil (light sweet, light sour, and heavy)".

In 2004, Kinder Morgan began the process to add a second pipeline, running parallel to the first, for the portion running between Hinton, Alberta, and Hargreaves, British Columbia. This required two more pumping stations – the Wolf Pump Station, near Niton Junction, Alberta, and the Chappel Pump Station, near Pyramid Creek Falls Provincial Park, British Columbia.

TMPL and oil refineries
Shell, Petro-Canada and Imperial closed refineries in British Columbia in the 1990s and expanded their refineries in the Edmonton, Alberta area following the TMPL construction. TMPL had the capacity to carry refined products, as well as crude oil via the batch system. According to a 2016 Oil Sands Magazine article, this resulted in the conversion of existing refineries along the TMPL route into storage and distribution facilities and terminals. In 1983, Kamloops' Royalite Refinery, was shutdown. In 1993, two refineries were closedShell's in North Burnabya large Vancouver neighbourhoodand Petro-Canada's in Port Coquitlam east of Vancouverwere closed. In 1995, Imperial Oil closed their refinery in Port Moodya city that is part of the Metro Vancouver Regional District.

Spill history
TMPL has reported approximately 84 spills to Canada's National Energy Board since 1961. Although a majority have occurred at contained zones such as pumping stations, and a majority were below the mandatory reporting threshold of 1.5 cubic metres, there have been some significant spill events.

In Abbotsford in 2005, a ruptured pipeline dumped  of crude oil. The company attributed the accident to activity on a neighbouring property. Some of it flowed into Burrard Inlet via the Burnaby storm sewer system. Most of it was recovered. Eleven houses were sprayed with oil, and about 225–250 residents were evacuated or left voluntarily. Cleanup took more than a year. In 2009, in Burnaby  of crude oil were released from a tank at the Trans Mountain Burnaby Terminal. Most of it flowed into a containment area.
In Sumas in 2012  of light crude oil leaked from a Sumas Mountain holding tank. All of it flowed into a containment area. In 2020, in Sumas,  of light crude leaked from small pipe connected to mainline. Trans Mountain reported on June 14, 2020 that the spill was contained on the property and that groundwater was monitored for contamination.

Trans Mountain Expansion Project
On June 18, 2013, Kinder Morgan filed an application with the Canadian National Energy Board pursuant to Part III of the National Energy Board Act to build a second pipeline under the Trans Mountain Pipeline Expansion Project. The second pipeline was to run roughly parallel to the existing pipeline, between Edmonton and Burnaby, (east of Vancouver) and to be used to transport diluted bitumen, also known as dilbit. The additional pipeline requires 12 new pumping stations. In 2016, the cost of completing the connection between Strathcona County, Alberta, and Burnaby, British Columbia was estimated at $6.8 billion in 2013.

Kinder Morgan had the support at that time of several large petroleum industry customers for this expansion, (BP Canada Energy Trading Co., Canadian Natural Resources, Canadian Oil Sands Ltd., Cenovus Energy Inc., Devon Canada Corp., Husky Energy Marketing Inc., Imperial Oil Ltd., Nexen Marketing Inc., Statoil Canada Ltd., Suncor Energy Marketing Inc., Suncor Energy Products Partnership, Tesoro Refining & Marketing Co, and Total E&P Canada Ltd).

In 2016, B.C. stated it did not support Trans Mountain, partly because Kinder Morgan has not provided enough information about its proposed spill prevention and spill clean-up program.
On November 29, 2016, Canada's federal cabinet approved the expansion project, announcing that the approval was "subject to 157 binding conditions that will address potential Indigenous, socio-economic and environmental impacts, including project engineering, safety and emergency preparedness."

On January 11, 2017, B.C. Premier Christy Clark announced British Columbia's support for the expansion of the Trans Mountain pipeline, saying the project met her government's five conditions for approval and includes a revenue-sharing agreement worth up to $1 billion.

In 2018, the federal government created the Crown corporation, the Trans Mountain Corporation (TMC) when it bought the pipeline from the Houston-based Kinder Morgan for C$4.5 billion. The purchase had been announced by the federal government in May 2018. At that time, the government said it would seek outside investors to complete the expansion. These investors would also be indemnified for any delays induced by provincial or municipal governments.

In 2020, three insurance companies that had previously supported the project withdrew their support, including Zurich Insurance Group, the leading insurer. The company that is advancing the project says that it still has enough insurance coverage.

By February 2020, the assessment for the completion of the project was estimated at $12.6 billion, an increase of the previous estimate of $7.4 billion. The cost increase was the result of rising costs of "labour, steel, and land".

In a September 2020 interview with the Canadian Press, TMC's CEO Ian Anderson said that the expansion was on schedule despite the $5.2-billion increase in its cost. Anderson cited other challenges to construction including the COVID-19 pandemic, the slump in the demand for fuel, which contributes to the slump in the price of oil, and the ongoing protests by opponents to the expansion.

By February 2022, the Crown corporation that owned Trans Mountain, TMC, said that costs had increased by 70%, from $12.6 billion to $21.4 billion. Faced with the federal government's costly COVID-19 response, Finance Minister Chrystia Freeland, said this new funding for the pipeline was not part of the federal government's commitment. The status of the company changed to a non-agent Crown corporation on April 29, 2022, which meant that it was able to access financing from third-party lenders. In March 2023, it was announced that the cost has again increased to $30.9 billion.

As of April 2022, construction had reached the half-way mark. The company said in their November 29, 2022 third quarter report that expansion would be mechanically complete by the third quarter of 2023 and the commercial service would be operational in the fourth quarter of 2023.

Debate
The expansion project has faced criticism, particularly from environmentalists and First Nations groups. The existing and proposed pipelines ship diluted bitumen through the Strait of Juan de Fuca, an extremely sensitive environmental region. To reach the terminus, tankers have to pass through a very narrow channel of shallow water from the open sea, still putting leaks at risk due to vehicle crashes. Environmentalists have expressed concern about the heightened risk of an oil spill in the Burrard Inlet resulting from the expansion, which entails the obstruction of 30% of the inlet and a seven-fold increase in tanker traffic, according to Stand.earth, formerly ForestEthics.

Those who support the pipeline say that it will create jobs and that it has a lower risk of spilling oil than transporting oil by rail, which pipeline proponents say would otherwise have to be used.

A 2014 study by Simon Fraser University claimed that Kinder Morgan overestimated the economic benefits of the pipeline expansion. From 2008 through 2018, Western Canadian Select (WCS), Canada's benchmark for heavy crude oil sold at an average discount of US$17 against the benchmark for light oil, West Texas Intermediate (WTI). This widened to a record US$50 in the fall of 2018 with the price of WCS hitting a record low of less than US$14 a barrel.

Despite federal government approval, seven Federal Court challenges were filed by the municipalities of Vancouver and Burnaby, and the Tsleil-Waututh, Squamish, Kwantlen, and Coldwater First Nations. In November 2017, Minister of Natural Resources Jim Carr stated that the federal government had sent a letter in support of a dispute resolution process to the National Energy Board to expedite any future disputes over provincial or municipal permits impeding the expansion. BC Environmental Minister George Heyman accused the federal government of interfering with an independent review of the project, arguing that "it's both a highly unusual and a highly troubling intrusion on a province's right to enforce its own permits, its own regulations and the interests of its own citizens".

On January 30, 2018, the B.C. government proposed a restriction on increases to the amount of diluted bitumen that can be imported into the province from Alberta, until the completion of studies on whether potential spillage could be mitigated. The province also announced an intent to consult with local communities and First Nations among others. Alberta premier Rachel Notley criticized the proposal as being a stalling tactic on Trans Mountain expansion, explaining that "the B.C. government has every right to consult on whatever it pleases with its citizens. It does not have the right to rewrite our constitution and assume powers for itself that it does not have." On February 6, 2018, Notley ordered the Alberta Gaming and Liquor Commission to cease future imports of British Columbia wine as a retaliatory sanction over these moves.  The wine sanctions were lifted on February 22, 2018.

On April 8, 2018, Kinder Morgan suspended "non-essential" activities relating to the pipeline, as the company did not want to "put  shareholders at risk on the remaining project spend". The company stated that it would attempt to reach agreements on a funding plan with stakeholders by May 31. On April 16, 2018, the Alberta government introduced the Preserving Canada's Economic Prosperity Act, which would give the Minister of Energy power to regulate the export of crude oil, natural gas, or refined fuel from Alberta. The bill could be used to effectively ban the export of Alberta gas to British Columbia. As such, B.C. Attorney General David Eby threatened to sue Alberta over the proposed bill, as he considered it unconstitutional, and stated that it could have a further impact on gasoline prices in the province.

On May 29, 2018, the Canadian federal government announced its intent to acquire the Trans Mountain Pipeline from Kinder Morgan for $4.5 billion. The government does not intend to remain the permanent owner of the pipeline, as it plans to seek outside investors to finance the twinning project. If the government cannot find a buyer before the consummation of the purchase, it will carry out the purchase via a crown corporation, and operate it in the meantime. The eventual owner will be indemnified by the government for any delays or hindrances to the project that result from legal actions by provincial or municipal governments. The government will also have the option to cover costs or purchase the pipeline back if the new owner is unable to complete the project due to legal pressure, or, despite reasonable efforts, cannot complete the project by an established deadline.

Critics of the expansion argued that this proposed purchase was a taxpayer-funded bailout of the project. B.C. Premier John Horgan stated that the sale would not affect the provincial government's ongoing efforts to block the pipeline expansion, stating that "rather than go to the court to determine jurisdictions, they're making financial decisions that affect taxpayers and they'll have to be accountable for that". Stewart Phillip, president of the Union of British Columbia Indian Chiefs, stated that the union was "absolutely shocked and appalled that Canada is willingly investing taxpayers' money in such a highly controversial fossil fuel expansion project".

On August 30, 2018, Kinder Morgan Canada's shareholders voted to approve the sale of the pipeline to the federal government. However, the same day, the Federal Court of Appeal overturned the government's approval of the expansion project, citing that it did not sufficiently fulfill its constitutional duties to consult local First Nations groups, and because it lacked an environmental assessment of increased tanker traffic on endangered killer whales, also known as orcas, in the Salish Sea off the BC coast. On August 31, Trudeau said the federal government remained committed to the pipeline expansion project in spite of this setback. In response to the approval being overturned, Premier Rachel Notley announced that Alberta would pull out of the national carbon price and called for an appeal to the Supreme Court of Canada of the federal court's August 30 decision.

Protests
In September 2012, Tsleil-Waututh leaders had hoped to shut down the project altogether on September 1, 2012.

During Burnaby Mountain protests in November 2014, opponents of the pipeline expansion camped in Burnaby Mountain Park to block pipeline construction crews, resulting in over 100 arrests. Their protests focused on Kinder Morgan's surveying work. Members of the Squamish and Tsleil-Waututh First Nations of British Columbia paddled canoes on the waters of Burrard Inlet to the Kinder Morgan Burnaby Terminal for a ceremony to protest the expansion of the Trans Mountain pipeline. In North Vancouver. In a 2020 Global News interview,  with the pipeline expansion work underway again, Grand Chief Stewart Phillip—president of the Union of BC Indian Chiefs, said that he expected that there would be more "Burnaby Mountain-style" protests.

Protests took place in Vancouver to stop work on Kinder Morgan on September 19, 2017.

Burnaby Mayor Derek Corrigan addressed the crowd, at the Stop Kinder Morgan protest rally, on Burnaby Mountain Park. By 2018, rallies opposing the projects had been organized across Canada. The expansion project faced strong opposition from civic governments, First Nations, environmentally concerned citizens, and others. Organizations including LeadNow and the Dogwood Initiative have also opposed the project and organized protests.

The RCMP contained the protests on Burnaby Mountain.

On July 3, 2018, activists blocked an oil tanker from the Ironworkers Memorial Bridge in Vancouver.

On September 28, 2021, a treetop camp in the Brunette River Conservation Area was dismantled by RCMP following a court injunction. The protest camp had been occupied by protesters since December 2020, and a leader of the protest claimed further actions would be planned.

Secwépemc opposition 
According to Aboriginal Peoples Television Network, since 2013, Secwépemc community members, primarily women, have been defending their traditional land (known as Secwepemcul’ecw) from the proposed expansion of the pipeline, asserting that the expansion was approved without sufficient consultation. The expansion would cross 518 km of Secwépemc territory. The land defenders (as they call themselves; some media refers to them as protesters and activists) are concerned about the damage to the land and water the pipeline passes through, in particular the disruption of salmon populations, violation of the Declaration on the Rights of Indigenous Peoples, and violation of traditional Secwépemc law, founded by the Okanagan Shuswap Confederacy. Their claim is that the First Nation band governments only have jurisdiction through Canadian law on their reserves, whereas traditional Secwépemc leadership retains sovereignty over Secwepemcul’ecw.

Since July 2018, a Secwépemc protest camp has been occupied just outside of Blue River, British Columbia, where there are plans to drill under the river. That camp, established by a group known as the Tiny House Warriors, is located near a planned "work camp" (referred to by Indigenous dissenters as a "man camp" because of the predominance of men in the demographics of pipeline workers). The establishment of the camp led Kúkpi7 (Chief) Rosanne Casimir of Tk’emlúps te Secwépemc First Nation (TteS), along with Chief Shelly Loring of Simpcw First Nation to issue a joint statement asking the Tiny House Warriors to stand down, claiming it was the Warriors violating Secwépemc law.

In early September 2020, protester Loralie Dick chained herself to the TMX worksite in Kamloops before being arrested by the RCMP for violating a B.C. Supreme Court injunction from 2018 that barred land defenders from blocking work.

In early October 2020, a protest camp was set up along the Thompson River, along the proposed route of the expansion. One of the residents of the Thompson River camp was Secwépemc matriarch Miranda Dick, who told reporters there were an average of 20 people at the camp as of October 5. At the time it was set up, Kúkpi7 Casimir said she had no issue with the protest camp, so long as health and safety guidelines were followed. On October 9, in response to TMX workers being seen surveying in preparation to drill under the river, the camp was moved directly in the way of the expansion. On October 10, the Secwépemc delivered a cease and desist notice to TMX for the second time. On October 11 it was moved again due to a chemical leak in the river. By October 15, the RCMP had begun arresting people connected to the camp, including Hereditary Chief Segwses, Loralie Dick, April Thomas, Billie Pierre and Romilly Cavanaugh. In February 2020, Segwses and his daughter gave themselves up for arrest for participating in the 2020 Canadian pipeline and railway protests, in order to prevent the RCMP from snuffing a sacred fire as well as to prevent the escalation of a confrontation.

On October 17, 2020, Dick cut her hair in ceremony before the gates of the expansion project. Soon after the ceremony, she and four other women were arrested by RCMP officers. One was arrested without charges, while the other four are set to appear in court in January 2021. In a statement released the following day, TteS Kúkpi7 Rosanne Casimir thanked the RCMP for maintaining peace and order and stated that she and the elected council did not endorse the protesters. TteS is one of several First Nations bands that have signed agreements with Trans Mountain. Casimir's statement asserted that the council "[had] not sold or ceded or given anything away" but that "[they had] upheld [their] jurisdictional rights."

Phase III consultations (November 2018-)

In response to the Federal Court's overturning the federal authorization of Trans Mountain, the Canadian Government "reinitiated Phase III consultations" with Natural Resources Canada as lead and Justice Frank Iacobucci appointed by the government to oversee consultations. An NEB panel heard three weeks of Indigenous traditional testimony with 117 Indigenous groups impacted by the pipeline, beginning on November 19, with sessions in Calgary, Victoria and Nanaimo.

The Trudeau government restricted the Phase III hearings in terms of time and scope. The government gave the NEB a "tight timeline" with a final report due on February 22, 2019. The hearings are also restricted by the NEB panel to investigate "new information" as it relates to the impact of increased oil tanker traffic to and from the Westridge Marine Terminal in Burrard Inlet, Burnaby to Canada's 12-nautical-mile territorial waters. The environmental concern in this area includes the Salish Sea's southern resident killer whales' (SRKW) prime Chinook salmon feeding ground. By November 2018, there were only 74 SRKW left. Noise and pollution from marine vessels along with the diminishing stocks of salmon – their prime source of food – have contributed to the whales' declining numbers.

Hearings in the form of pipeline roundtable meetings with Trans Mountain representative and indigenous groups took place in Calgary in November, and in Kamloops and Nanaimo in December, with the summary expected in January.

Government of Canada June 18, 2019 approval of TMX

On June 18, 2019, the federal government through the Governor in Council (GIC) confirmed the approval of federally-owned TMX  project. The twinned pipeline will have the capacity to carry almost 1 million bpd from Alberta to the coast of British Columbia. The National Energy Board, Prime Minister Justin Trudeau and his cabinet agreed that the TMX was in the "national interest" as it would add "tens of billions of dollars" to government revenue as well as sustaining thousands of jobs. Both the NEB and the federal government acknowledged that there was a possibility that TMX could "damage the environment and marine life", but the benefits outweighed the risks.

Prime Minister Trudeau said that the revenue from TMC, which was estimated at $500 million annually just in federal corporate taxes, would be invested in "unspecified clean energy projects".

In their letter sent to both Trans Mountain and the lawyers representing the Tsleil-Waututh Nation, the NEB wrote that within the context of "substantial" and "significant" interest and participation on the part of Indigenous peoples and the general public, including the August 30, 2018 decision in Tsleil-Waututh Nation v. Canada, the NEB's regulatory oversight processes for the next phases of the Trans Mountain Expansion Project "lifecycle", which include "detailed route approvals", such as potential "routing and non-routing", would include a public comment period.

SCC 2020 decisions dismissing appeals challenging TMX
By December 2019, the legal basis of the expansion was challenged in Canada's Federal Court of Appeal as politicians, environmentalists and some Indigenous groups returned to the courts and pressed the issue of Aboriginal title. Some Indigenous groups, such as the Kehewin Cree Nation, T'Sou-ke Nation, Frog Lake First Nation, Scia'new First Nation, Simpcw First Nation, Pellt'iq't First Nation and Squiala First Nation formed the Western Indigenous Pipeline Group (WIPG) and have sanctioned the project for ownership stakes. Others, like the Coldwater Indian Band, have unsettled issues. These issues include disputes over the compensation from the institution of the first pipeline right-of-way in the 1950s, as well as future water supply risks that they would assume.

In February 2020, a Federal Court of Appeal denied the request by environment and Indigenous groups to "consider whether there had been sufficient consultation".

A March 5, 2020 Supreme Court  March, "decided not to hear five challenges from environment and Indigenous groups".

On July 2, 2020, the Supreme Court of Canada rejected appeals by the Squamish Nation, Tsleil-Waututh Nation, and Coldwater Indian Band and others challenging federal approval of the Trans Mountain pipeline expansion project, "bringing an end to the years-long legal challenge".

See also
Eagle Spirit Pipeline
Northern Gateway Pipeline

Notes

References

External links
 Oil Across the Rockies - Documentary of the building of the pipeline.
 The Building of Trans Mountain: Canada's First Oil Pipeline Across the Rockies - Book about the building of the pipeline.

Athabasca oil sands
Kinder Morgan
Oil pipelines in Canada
Proposed pipelines in Canada
Pipelines in Alberta
Transport buildings and structures in British Columbia
Justin Trudeau controversies
Political controversies in Canada
Environmental justice